Israel Ziv (born 1957) is an Israeli retired general who held several prominent posts including the head of the IDF's Operations Directorate. In December 2018 the U.S. Treasury slapped sanctions on Israel Ziv accusing him of using an agricultural consultancy as cover for weapons sales to the South Sudan.

Military service
Ziv was drafted into the IDF in 1975. He volunteered as a paratrooper in the Paratroopers Brigade. He served as a soldier and a squad leader and took part in various raids against armed Palestinian organizations and camps in Lebanon, including Operation Litani. he became an infantry officer after completing Officer Candidate School and returning to the Paratroopers Brigade as a platoon leader. he served as a company commander and in the 1982 Lebanon War he led the 35th Paratroopers Brigade's Reconnaissance company during heavy fighting against PLO operatives and the Syrian army. Ziv led 101st "Peten" (Elapidae) paratroop battalion and the 35th Paratroopers Brigade in counter-guerrilla operations in South Lebanon. Later on he served as head of the Paratroopers and Infantry Corps and commanded the Gaza Division during the Second Intifada. in 2003 he was appointed head of the IDF's Operations Directorate.

References

1957 births
Living people
Israeli generals
Israeli Jews